Gordon Thomas Lund (born February 23, 1941, at Iron Mountain, Michigan) is an American former Major League Baseball shortstop, second baseman and third baseman. He stood 5'11" (180 cm) tall and weighed 170 pounds (77 kg). During his two-season Major League career, Lund batted .261, with 12 hits, no home runs, and one run batted in.

Lund was an adept defensive player who spent almost his entire 11-year playing career in minor league baseball (1960–1970). He signed with the Cleveland Indians and in his 1960 rookie season led Florida State League shortstops in putouts. The following year, he led Carolina League shortstops in double plays and fielding percentage. But Lund did not reach Cleveland until August 1, 1967, and received only a three-game trial with the Indians before being acquired along with John O'Donoghue by the Baltimore Orioles for Eddie Fisher and minor leaguers Johnny Scruggs and Bob Scott on November 28, 1967. Lund along with Gene Brabender was traded from the Orioles to the Seattle Pilots for Chico Salmon on March 31, 1969. He appeared in 20 games with the Pilots in 1969, 17 at shortstop, batting .263 with one RBI. Despite his fielding prowess as a minor leaguer, in the Majors he made six errors in 61 total chances at shortstop, for a poor .902 fielding average.

From 1974–1982, Lund managed in the Chicago White Sox farm system from the Class A to the Triple-A levels. He compiled a won–loss mark of 608–615 (.497). His 1978 Appleton Foxes won the Midwest League championship.

See also
1967 Cleveland Indians season
1969 Seattle Pilots season

References

External links

1941 births
Living people
Baseball players from Michigan
Burlington Indians players (1958–1964)
Cleveland Indians players
Hawaii Islanders players
Jacksonville Suns players
Major League Baseball shortstops
Minor league baseball managers
People from Iron Mountain, Michigan
Portland Beavers players
Rochester Red Wings players
Salt Lake City Bees players
Seattle Pilots players
Syracuse Chiefs players
Vancouver Mounties players